Jean-Marie Louvel (1 July 1900 – 13 June 1970) was a French engineer and politician.

1900 births
1970 deaths
People from Orne
Politicians from Normandy
Popular Republican Movement politicians
French Ministers of Commerce and Industry
Members of the Constituent Assembly of France (1945)
Members of the Constituent Assembly of France (1946)
Deputies of the 1st National Assembly of the French Fourth Republic
Deputies of the 2nd National Assembly of the French Fourth Republic
Deputies of the 3rd National Assembly of the French Fourth Republic
French Senators of the Fifth Republic
Senators of Calvados (department)
Mayors of Caen
20th-century French engineers
École Polytechnique alumni